Skyfire may refer to:

Skyfire (band), a Swedish metal band
Skyfire (Canberra), an annual fireworks show held in Canberra, Australia
Skyfire (company), a mobile software company
SkyFire (spacecraft), a planned nanosatellite spacecraft that will fly by the Moon
Skyfire (TV series)
Skyfire (web browser)
Skyfire (film), a 2019 Chinese action film directed by Simon West
Skyfire Summit, a UFO conference held by a claimed abduction victim
Project Skyfire, an investigation of cloud seeding
Skyfire, the cartoon name for the Transformers Autobot character also known as "Jetfire"